BHA may refer to:

Businesses and organisations
 Berkshire Hathaway Assurance, an American company
Backcountry Hunters & Anglers, Montana, U.S.
 Boston Housing Authority, an American public agency
 Brighter Horizons Academy, an Islamic college in Garland, Texas, U.S.
 Brighton & Hove Albion F.C., an English association football club
 British Homeopathic Association
 British Horseracing Authority
 British Hospitality Association
 British Humanist Association (now Humanists UK)
 Buddha Air, a Nepalese airline, ICAO code BHA
 Bush Heritage Australia

Science and technology
 Beta hydroxy acid, an organic compound
 Bottom hole assembly, a component of a drilling rig
 Butylated hydroxyanisole, a food additive
 BHA (for "Butt-Head Astronomer"), a code-name for the Power Macintosh 7100 computer

Other uses
 Bahamas, UNDP country code
 Bibliography of the History of Art, an electronic database by Getty Research Institute
 Los Perales Airport, Bahía de Caráquez, Ecuador, IATA code BHA
Area code 242 (BHA), North American dialling code for The Bahamas
 Bharia language, ISO 939-3 code bha
 Binhai railway station, China Railway Pinyin code BHA